Andrew Paterson may refer to:

Banjo Paterson (Andrew Barton Paterson, 1864–1941), Australian bush poet
Andrew J. Paterson (born 1952), Canadian artist
Andy Paterson, British film producer
Andrew Paterson (cricketer) (born 1947), New Zealand cricketer
Andrew Paterson (photographer) (1877–1948), Scottish photographer

See also
Andrew Patterson (disambiguation)
Andrew Pattison (born 1949), Rhodesian tennis player